is the 11th single of the Japanese singer Miho Komatsu released under Giza studio label. The single reached #19 rank first week and sold 15,020 copies. It charted for 2 weeks and totally sold 19,640 copies.

Track list
All songs are written and composed by Miho Komatsu and arranged by Yoshinobu Ohga

 (instrumental)

References 

2000 singles
Miho Komatsu songs
Songs written by Miho Komatsu
2000 songs
Giza Studio singles
Being Inc. singles
Song recordings produced by Daiko Nagato